Michael Hodges may refer to:

 Michael Hodges (Royal Navy officer) (1874–1951)
 Michael Hodges (writer) (born 1976), American speculative fiction writer
 Michael Hodges (producer), American singer-songwriter, record producer and music executive
 Mike Hodges (born 1932), English screenwriter, film director, playwright and novelist
 Mike Hodges (American football) (born 1945), American football player and coach
 Michael Hodges (American football) (born 1986), American football coach